Leo Quinn is a British business executive.  In 2015 he became the Group Chief Executive of Balfour Beatty. In October 2013, he founded The 5% Club

Early life and education 
As a young man Quinn worked at his father's business in West London. He was educated at Imperial College and Portsmouth University, earning an MSc in Management Science, DIC, and a BSc in Civil Engineering.

Career 
Quinn worked as a civil engineer for Balfour Beatty, beginning in 1979. He worked for 16 years with Honeywell inc. in various management roles, including Global President of H&BC Enterprise Solutions.

For three years, Quinn was COO in the production management division of Invensys, a multinational engineering and information technology company headquartered in London, United Kingdom.

From 2004 to 2008, Quinn was Chief Executive of De La Rue plc, a support service company  involved in security printing, papermaking and cash handling systems.

He was also a director of Tomkins plc.

Quinn became Group Chief Executive of QinetiQ Group PLC in November 2009, replacing Graham Love. and succeeded in increasing the company's pre-tax profits. He remained in this position until 2014, when he was hired by Balfour Beatty, which had been struggling financially, to create a turnaround plan.

In October 2013, Quinn founded The 5% Club.

Personal

Quinn is married with two step sons. Quinn has three brothers and one sister.

References

External links

Year of birth missing (living people)
Living people